The Tanzania FA Cup (also called the Azam Sports Federation Cup) is the top knockout tournament of the Tanzanian football.

Previously, the Nyerere Cup  was the top knockout tournament. It was created in 1974 and was contested by teams from both Tanzania mainland and the Isles of Zanzibar.

Winners
Nyerere Cup
1974 : JKU FC (Zanzibar)
1975 : Young Africans FC (Dar es Salaam)
1976 : Rangers International (Dar es Salaam)
1977 : KMKM (Zanzibar)
1978 : Pan African FC (Dar es Salaam)
1979 : Pan African FC (Dar es Salaam)
1980 : Coastal Union (Tanga)
1981 : Pan African FC (Datr-es-Salaam)
1982 : KMKM (Zanzibar)
1983 : KMKM (Zanzibar)
1984 : Simba SC (Dar es Salaam)
1985 : Miembeni SC (Zanzibar)
1986 : Miembeni SC (Zanzibar)
1987 : Miembeni SC (Zanzibar)
1988 : Coastal Union (Tanga)
1989 : Pamba FC (Mwanza)
1990 : Small Simba SC (Zanzibar)
1991 : Railways SC (Morogoro)
1992 : Pamba FC (Mwanza)
1993 : Malindi FC (Zanzibar)
1994 : Young Africans FC (Dar es Salaam)
1995 : Simba SC (Dar es Salaam)
1996 : Sigara SC (Dar es Salaam)
1997 : Tanzania Stars (Dar es Salaam)
1998 : Tanzania Stars (Dar es Salaam) 2-1 Prisons SC (Mbeya)
1999 : Young Africans FC (Dar es Salaam)
2000 : Simba SC (Dar es Salaam)
2001 : Polisi (Zanzibar) 2-0 Young Africans FC (Dar es Salaam)
2002 : JKT Ruvu Stars (Coast Region) 1-0 KMKM (Zanzibar)

Tanzania FA Cup
2015–16: Young Africans FC (Dar es Salaam) 3–1 Azam F.C.
2016–17: Simba SC (Dar es Salaam) 2–1 (aet) Mbao FC
2017–18: Mtibwa Sugar F.C. 3–2 Singida United F.C.
2018–19: Azam F.C.
2019–20: Simba SC
2020–21: Simba SC
2021–22: Young Africans FC (Dar es Salaam)

References

External links
Tanzania - List of Cup Winners, RSSSF.com

Tanzania
National association football cups
C
Recurring sporting events established in 1974
1974 establishments in Tanzania